Field sports are outdoor sports that take place in the wilderness or sparsely populated rural areas, where there are vast areas of uninhabited greenfields. The term specifically refers to activities that mandate sufficiently large open spaces and/or interaction with natural ecosystems, including hiking/canyoning, equestrianism, hawking, archery and shooting, but can also extend to various surface water sports such as river trekking, angling, rowing/paddling, rafting and boating/yachting.

Field sports are considered nostalgic pastimes, especially among country folk. For example, participants of field sports such as riding and fox hunting in the United Kingdom frequently wear traditional attires (British country clothing) to imitate landed gentries and aristocrats of the 19th-century English countryside.

Types
 Hiking, backpacking and camping
 Cross country/trail running and mountain biking
 Hillwalking, mountaineering, canyoning and caving
 Rock climbing, scrambling, rappelling and tree climbing
 Equestrianism (horse racing, polo, show jumping, dressage, etc.)
 Falconry
 Sport hunting (trophy hunting, safari/big game hunting, fowling)
 Bowhunting
 Sport fishing (angling, bowfishing, spearfishing, big game fishing)
 Shooting sport
 Field shooting (metallic silhouette, long-range, field target, etc)
 Clay pigeon
 Plinking
 Meat shooting
 Rook shooting
 Field archery
 Rowing/sculling, paddling (canoeing, kayaking, rafting), punting and paddleboarding

Environmental issues 

Field sports, by definition, involve activities away from typical human settlements, which implies entering into natural areas usually devoid of human presence. Such encroachments can potentially cause ecological disturbances to the wild faunae and florae, including environmental contamination by littered wastes (especially non-degradable plastic waste), wildfire risk from campfires and cigarette butts, disruption of groundcovers and topsoil due to trail-making and camping, damages to rocks by anchors used for aid climbing, irresponsible luring and feeding of wild animals, and light and sound pollution that can frequently trigger startle responses and territorial behaviors, leading to animal attacks, nest abandonment, habitat fragmentation and even habitat loss.

Some field sports, especially hunting and fishing, involve the catching and/or killing of wild animals (collectively referred as "game") for meat, for removing species in conflict with humans (often as volunteered assistance to farmers and landowners), or simply for personal leisure and trophy (i.e. sport hunting or "sporting"). Opponents to such sports consider them controversial, and even immoral, on grounds of animal cruelty (regarded as blood sports using wildlife), animal welfare (of the working animals such as horse and hunting dogs) and environmental protection (concerns for habitat conservation, overexploitation and poaching), especially those involving commercial incentives such as safari big game hunting.

See also
 Countryside Alliance
 The Field magazine
 Field & Stream magazine

References

Hunting
Traditional sports
Shooting sports